The Turks in Libya, also commonly referred to as Libyan Turks, Turco-Libyans, and Turkish-Libyans are the ethnic Turks who live in Libya. According to the last census which allowed citizens to declare their ethnicity, the Turkish minority formed the third largest ethnic group in the country, after the Arabs and Berbers, and they mainly live in Misrata, Tripoli, Zawiya, Benghazi and Derna.

During Ottoman rule in Libya (1551–1912), Turkish settlers began to migrate to the region from across the empire. A significant number of Turks intermarried with the native population, and the male offspring of these marriages were referred to as Kouloughlis due to their mixed heritage. However, in general, intermarriage was discouraged, in order to preserve the "Turkishness" of the community. Consequently, the terms "Turks" and "Kouloughlis" have traditionally been used to distinguish between those of full and partial Turkish ancestry. The Turkish community has traditionally dominated the political life of Libya.

After the disintegration of the Ottoman Empire, Turks continued to migrate to Libya from the newly established modern states, particularly from the Republic of Turkey, but also from other regions with significant Turkish settlements such as Cyprus, and Egypt.

When the Libyan Civil War erupted in 2011, Misrata became “the bastion of resistance” and Turco-Libyans figured prominently in the war. In 2014 a former Gaddafi officer reported to the New York Times that the civil war was now an "ethnic struggle" between Arab tribes (like the Zintanis) against those of Turkish ancestry (like the Misuratis), as well as against the Berbers and Circassians.

History

Ottoman Libya

When the Ottoman Empire conquered Libya in 1551 the Turks began migrating to the region mostly from Anatolia, including merchants and families. In addition, many Turkish soldiers married Libyan women and their children were known as the "Kouloughlis" (also referred to as the "Cologhla", "Qulaughli" and "Cologhli").

Today there are still Libyans who regard their ethnicity as Turkish, or acknowledge their descent from Turkish soldiers who settled in the area during the Ottoman rule. Indeed, many families in Libya can trace their origins through their surnames. It is very common for families to have surnames that belong to the region of Turkey that their ancestors migrated from; for example, Tokatlı, Eskişehirli, Muğlalı, and İzmirli are very common surnames.

Italian Libya
After Libya fell to the Italians in 1911, most Turks still remained in the region. According to the census conducted by the Italian colonialists in 1936 the Turkish community formed 5% of Libya's population, of which 30,000 lived along the Tripolitanian coast.

1936 census
The last census which allowed the Turkish minority to declare their ethnicity showed the following:

Modern migration to the State of Libya
Initially, modern Turkish labour migration has traditionally been to European countries within the context of bilateral agreements; however, a significant wave of migration also occurred in oil-rich nations like Libya and Saudi Arabia.

During Abd al-Salam Jallud's visit to Turkey in January 1975, a ‘breakthrough collaboration agreement’ was signed which involved sending
10,000 skilled Turkish workers to Libya, in order to expand the country's oil-rich economy. This agreement also included a Libyan commitment to supply crude oil to Turkey ‘at preferential rates’ and to establish a Turkish–Libyan Bank. By August 1975, Libya announced its desire ‘to absorb up to 100,000 Turkish workers annually’.

The Libyan–Turkish economic ties increased significantly with the number of Turkish construction companies operating in Libya in 1978–81 rising from 2 to 60, and by 1984, to 150. Moreover, in 1984, the number of Turkish "guest workers" in Libya increased to 120,000.

Demographics

There is a significant Turkish community living in the north-west of Libya. For example, many Turks settled in Misrata during the reign of Abdul Hamid II in the nineteenth century.

In 1971 the population of Turks with roots from the island of Crete alone numbered 100,000. In 2014, Ali Hammuda, who served as the Minister of Foundations and Religious Affairs of Libya, claimed that the Turkish minority forms 15% of Libya's total population. More recent estimates in 2019 suggest that the total Turkish population in Libya is around 1.4 million, or that more than one in four Libyans (i.e. 25% of the country's population) have Turkish ancestry.

The city of Misrata is considered to be the "main center of the Turkish-origin community in Libya"; in total, the Turks form approximately two-thirds (est.270,000) of Misrata's 400,000 inhabitants. There is also a thriving Turkish population in Tripoli. Turkish communities have also been formed in more remote areas of the country, such as the Turkish neighborhood of Hay al-Atrak, in the town of Awbari.

Diaspora
There is a significant Libyan-Turkish community living in Turkey where they are still referred to as "Libyan Turks".

Culture
As a result of four centuries of Ottoman rule in Libya, the Turks left some of their cultural imprints in the region, particularly their language, food, and costumes. In addition, some of the mosques and castles they built remain intact.

Language
In cities where there are significant Turkish communities, the Turkish language has traditionally thrived; however, today Turkish is more prevalent with the elderly whilst the younger generations speak Arabic. Even so, many words of Turkish origin have entered Libyan Arabic, especially in the old city of Tripoli.

Religion
The Ottoman Turks brought with them the teaching of the Hanafi School of Islam during the Ottoman rule of Libya which still survives among the Turkish descended families today. Examples of Ottoman-Turkish mosques include:

Associations and organisations

In Libya
Türk-Libya İşbirliği (The Turkish-Libyan Cooperation), established in 2011 
Libya Köroğlu Derneği (The Libyan Kouloughlis Association), established in 2015

In Turkey
The Association of Turks with Libyan Roots, established in 2011

Popular culture
In Mansour Bushnaf's debut novel Chewing Gum (2008), Rahma, who is the mother of the main character Mukhtar,  is from a Turco-Libyan family. The book was banned during Muammar Gaddafi's regime.

Notable people

Salah Badi, commander of the Al-Somood Front
Husni Bey, business tycoon
Wissam Bin Hamid, commander in the Libya Dawn
Mukhtar al-Jahawi, commander of the Anti-Terrorism Force
Abdul Rauf Kara, leader of the Special Deterrence Force
Ahmed Karamanli, founded the Karamanli dynasty (1711–1835)
successors:
Ahmed I (29 July 1711 – 4 November 1745)
Mehmed Pasha (4 November 1745 – 24 July 1754)
Ali I Pasha (24 July 1754 – 30 July 1793)
Ali Burghul Pasha Cezayrli (30 July 1793 – 20 January 1795)
Ahmed II (20 January – 11 June 1795)
Yusuf Karamanli (11 June 1795 – 20 August 1832)
Mehmed Karamanli (1817, 1826, and 1832)
Mehmed ibn Ali (1824 and 1835) 
Ali II Karamanli (20 August 1832 – 26 May 1835)
Sadullah Koloğlu, former prime minister of Benghazi and Darnah (from 1949 to 1952)
Ahmed Maiteeq, served briefly as Libyan Prime Minister in 2014
Omar Abdullah Meheishy, former Member of the Libyan Revolutionary Command Council
Shaha Riza
Muhammad Sakizli, Libyan politician
Ali al-Sallabi, historian and Islamist
Mustafa Sanalla, the chairman of the National Oil Corporation 
Fayez al-Sarraj, Chairman of the Presidential Council of Libya and prime minister of the Government of National Accord 
father: Mostafa al-Sarraj, former minister
Mohamed Sowan, leader of the Justice and Construction Party
Abdel Rahman al-Suwayhili, Parliament member and founder of the Union for Homeland
Sema Sgaier, scientist and global health expert
Ramadan al-Suwayhili, a co-founder of the short-lived Tripolitanian Republic in 1918
Hassan Tatanaki, businessman 
Hamida al-Unayzi, champion of women's education in Libya

See also
Turkish minorities in the former Ottoman Empire
Turks in the Arab world
Turks in Algeria
Turks in Tunisia
 Foreign relations of Libya
 History of Libya

References

Bibliography
 
.

.
.
.
.
.

.
.
.

Libya
Ethnic groups in Libya
Libya